This is a list of the National Register of Historic Places listings in Washington County, Utah.

This is intended to be a complete list of the properties and districts on the National Register of Historic Places in Washington County, Utah, United States. Latitude and longitude coordinates are provided for many National Register properties and districts; these locations may be seen together in a map.

There are 84 properties and districts listed on the National Register in the county.  Of these, 25 are located within Zion National Park and are described in National Register of Historic Places listings in Zion National Park.  This list covers the 55 others. One other site in the county was once listed, but has since been removed.



Current listings
Besides those included in Zion National Park, the current listings are:

 

|}

Former listing

|}

See also
 National Register of Historic Places listings in Zion National Park
 List of National Historic Landmarks in Utah
 National Register of Historic Places listings in Utah

References

External links

Washington